The following is a list of English-dubbed episodes of the anime television series Doraemon (2005 anime).

Series overview

Episodes

Season 1 (2014)

Season 2 (2015)

See also

List of Doraemon episodes (2005 anime) (seasons 1–3)
List of Doraemon episodes (2005 anime) (seasons 4–6)
List of Doraemon episodes (2005 anime) (seasons 7–9)
List of Doraemon episodes (2005 anime) (seasons 10–13)

References

External links

2014 American television series debuts
Doraemon lists
Doraemon (anime)
Disney XD original programming
Television shows set in North Carolina
Disney Channels Worldwide original programming